The Nangli Metro Station is located on the Grey Line of the Delhi Metro. The station was opened for public on 4 October 2019.

As part of Phase III of Delhi Metro, Nangli is a metro station of the Grey Line.

Station layout

Entry/Exit

Connections
DTC Buses, cluster buses as well as mini buses available to connect various parts of delhi like DTC Bus no. 764 817 835 etc.
Najafgarh Sai Baba Mandir 500 meters from the nangli metro station.
Nangli Sakrawati small industry area is also few steps from metro station.
Delhi metro najafgarh Depot also very close.
Nearby colonies nangli sakrawati, nangli dairy, nangli vihar, arjun park, jemini park, indra park and many more.

See also
List of Delhi Metro stations
Transport in Delhi
Delhi Metro Rail Corporation
Delhi Suburban Railway

References

External links

 Delhi Metro Rail Corporation Ltd. (Official site) 
 Delhi Metro Annual Reports
 

Delhi Metro stations
Railway stations in South West Delhi district
Railway stations in India opened in 2019